Afghan New Zealanders are New Zealanders whose ancestors came from Afghanistan or who were born in Afghanistan.

History of immigration
Afghan Migration to New Zealand started in the early 1980s, by mid-1990 a new wave of Afghans had fled Afghanistan to escape the civil war that was ensuing after the rapid withdrawal of the Soviets and the fall of the Democratic Republic of Afghanistan in 1992, many of these Afghans had close ties to many high ranking Afghan officials in the government and many also were high-ranking officials in the army themselves, starting their lives from scratch and calling New Zealand home.

131 Afghans came to New Zealand as refugees on the MV Tampa during the Tampa affair in 2001.

Following the Taliban takeover of Afghanistan in late August 2021, the New Zealand Government offered 1,253 visas to Afghans. The New Zealand Defence Force participated in international efforts to evacuate Afghans who had worked for Western military forces. By early October 2021, only 428 had arrived in New Zealand. In response, the New Zealand Government dispatched a special envoy to the Middle East to help 825 stranded Afghan visa holders to leave Afghanistan.

Examples
Omar Slaimankhel

See also

 Afghan Australians
 Afghan Canadians
 Afghan Americans
 Afghans in Sweden

References

Asian New Zealander
New Zealander